Todd Joseph Miller (born June 4, 1981) is an American comedian and actor.

In 2008, he made his acting debut in Cloverfield, and from 2010 to 2014, he voiced Tuffnut Thorston in the first two How to Train Your Dragon films. From 2014 to 2017, he starred as Erlich Bachman in the HBO sitcom Silicon Valley and also played Marvel Comics character Weasel in 2016's Deadpool and its 2018 sequel. Miller also has had roles in films such as Yogi Bear, She's Out of My League, Transformers: Age of Extinction, Big Hero 6, Hell and Back, Office Christmas Party, The Emoji Movie, and Ready Player One.

Early life and education
Miller was born in Denver, Colorado, the son of Leslie Miller, a clinical psychologist, and Kent Miller, an attorney from Chanute, Kansas. He attended Graland Country Day School and graduated from Denver's East High School, where he participated in drama productions. His father, who is Christian, is of English, Scottish, German and Swedish ancestry, whereas his mother, who is Ashkenazi Jewish, is of German-Jewish, Austrian-Jewish, and Russian-Jewish ancestry.

In 2003, Miller graduated from George Washington University in Washington, D.C. with a B.A. in psychology with a concentration in situation theory and social influence. At GWU, he was a member of the comedy group receSs and the Lambda chapter of Phi Sigma Kappa fraternity. While in college, Miller studied the circus arts at Frichess Theatre Urbain in Paris and attended the British American Drama Academy in London, where he studied Shakespeare for a summer.

Career

Stand-up
After college, Miller moved to Chicago and began to perform improvisation and stand-up comedy, performing with many local troupes. He toured with The Second City for two years. In 2008, he was named one of Variety's 10 Comics To Watch.

In 2011, Miller released a comedy special, No Real Reason, and a comedy album, Mash Up Audiofile in 2012.

In 2015, he was part of Funny or Die's Oddball Comedy and Curiosity Festival, a touring show which included Amy Schumer, Aziz Ansari, and other comics.

On June 17, 2017, HBO premiered his hour-long stand-up special, T.J. Miller: Meticulously Ridiculous, which was filmed in Miller's native Denver at the end of his 2016 Meticulously Ridiculous Tour.

In October 2017, Miller began his "Touring In Perpetuity Tour", a self described "One Man Philosophy Circus."

Television
Miller appeared frequently as a member of the "round table" on Chelsea Lately. He appeared as Marmaduke Brooker in Carpoolers, which ran for 13 episodes on ABC in 20072008. In 2012, he voiced Robbie Valentino on the Disney channel cartoon Gravity Falls. On December 13, 2010, October 28, 2011, and June 14, 2012, he performed stand-up on Conan. On November 15, 2011, his stand-up special No Real Reason premiered on Comedy Central. In 2011, he hosted a special called Mash Up, which was picked up in 2012 for a full season by Comedy Central. He starred in the Fox TV series The Goodwin Games as Jimmy Goodwin.

Miller starred in the HBO sitcom Silicon Valley, which has been met with widespread critical acclaim and he won the Critics' Choice Television Award for Best Supporting Actor in a Comedy Series in 2015. In May 2017, Miller and HBO jointly announced that Miller would not be returning for the 5th season of Silicon Valley.

As a commercial actor, he voiced a talking ball of mucus in commercials for Mucinex and starred as Greg the Genie in a promotional campaign for Slim Jim meat snacks.

He voiced Gorburger, a giant blue monster talk show host, on The Gorburger Show, which originally aired on Funny or Die and YouTube for 2 seasons in 201213, then on Comedy Central for a 3rd season in 2017 before being cancelled.

Film
In Cloverfield, Miller's film debut, he appeared onscreen for only a few minutes, but his voice was heard in almost every scene as the character who videotaped most of the events depicted. In 2009, he played Cessna Jim in The Goods: Live Hard, Sell Hard and the dim-witted grindcore musician Rory in Mike Judge's comedy Extract. In 2010, he co-starred in She's Out of My League as Stainer, played Brian the Concierge in Get Him to the Greek and appeared in a supporting role in the film Unstoppable.

He voiced the character 'Tuffnut' in the Oscar-nominated animated films How to Train Your Dragon and How to Train Your Dragon 2. He also played Dan in Gulliver's Travels, released in December 2010.

He played the supporting character of Ranger Jones in the live-action/animated Yogi Bear 2010 film. Unlike his character on the cartoon show, he is "dumb-but-not-in-a-funny-way", according to the Buffalo News. He was cast in the part after two auditions; as a joke, he sent Warner Bros. an improvised video audition with an actual bear, though he had already been offered the part before they received it.

In 2011, he appeared in the film Our Idiot Brother. He had a cameo as administrative personnel for Rolling Stone in the 2012 film Rock of Ages. He starred in the 2016 movie Search Party alongside Adam Pally.

In 2014, he appeared in Transformers: Age of Extinction. In November 2014, he was the voice of Fred in the superhero CGI film Big Hero 6. He also played Weasel in Deadpool and Deadpool 2. In 2017, he portrayed the voice of the main protagonist Gene, a meh emoji with abnormal expressions, in the animated The Emoji Movie, which received extremely negative reviews. In late March 2018, he appeared in a supporting role as I-R0K in the film Ready Player One, which was directed by Steven Spielberg.

Audio 
On September 12, 2011, Miller released a comedy rap concept album titled The Extended Play E.P. The album features comedians Bo Burnham, Doug Benson, Pete Holmes and hip-hop artists Ugly Duckling and Johnny Polygon.

In 2012, Miller released The Extended Play E.P. Illegal Art Remix Tape. Also in 2012, Miller released Mash Up Audiofile on Comedy Central Records to mixed reviews.

Miller started appearing on Chicago-based comedy Podcast Red Bar Radio in 2006 as a semi-regular co-host. He hosts a podcast with friend and fellow comedian Cash Levy, titled Cashing in With TJ Miller, which began airing in March 2012 on the Nerdist Network. He is also a frequent guest on Doug Benson's podcast Doug Loves Movies.

Personal life
In 2014, Miller became engaged to his longtime girlfriend, actress and installation artist Kate Gorney, who changed her last name to Miller. They were married at the Denver Botanic Gardens on September 6, 2015.

Miller described learning about an undiagnosed cerebral arteriovenous malformation on his right frontal lobe on the Pete Holmes podcast You Made It Weird on October 28, 2011. He stated that he became more philosophical, narrated his behaviors, and was unable to sleep while filming Yogi Bear in New Zealand in 2010. His brain surgery was successful, though there was a 10 percent risk of fatality.

Miller considers himself a "positive nihilist".

Controversies and legal issues

Uber assault incident 
On December 9, 2016, Miller was arrested and jailed in Los Angeles for allegedly assaulting a driver of the Uber car service company following a debate he had with the driver over Donald Trump, of whom Miller is a critic. He was released on his own recognizance after bail was set at $20,000. Miller reached a settlement with the driver in March 2018.

Sexual assault allegations
In late 2017, allegations against Miller from his time in college in 2001 resurfaced, part of the Me Too movement and Weinstein effect. An anonymous woman who attended George Washington University with Miller told The Daily Beast reporter Asawin Suebsaeng that Miller (her then-boyfriend) became violent with her during a sexual encounter; he allegedly choked, shook, and punched her in the mouth, all without her consent.

Suebsaeng attempted to contact witnesses and other people involved with the case, some of whom corroborated the accuser's story, adding that it was brought to the attention of the college at the time. Student conduct proceedings were held, the results of which are sealed, although Suebsaeng wrote that "knowledgeable sources" had said that he was declared to be "expelled" at the conclusion of the proceedings.

The Millers responded to the allegations, characterizing the accuser as a vindictive former colleague in a campus comedy troupe who was asked to leave due to inappropriate behavior. The statement said that "[s]adly she is now using the current climate to bandwagon and launch these false accusations again", and also stated that her accusation "undermines the important movement to make women feel safe coming forward about legitimate claims against real known predators".

Transphobic email allegations
On December 19, 2017, it was reported that Miller had sent a transphobic email to film critic Danielle Solzman, a trans woman, while misgendering and repeatedly deadnaming her. Solzman had previously tweeted a screenshot of the email in August with Miller's name redacted, out of fear he would take legal action against Solzman. The email, prompted by Solzman inquiring about a transphobic slur in Miller's website description, included Miller referring to Solzman as a "weird strange terrible man" and a "fucking asshole" and saying that Solzman's "pursuit of transgender identity is nothing more than an opportunity for you to distinguish yourself as someone who is special".

Solzman had met and befriended Miller in the Chicago improv scene, and said that he had been supportive of Solzman newly coming out as a trans woman, and that Solzman was unsure why Miller had seemingly become hostile. In the HuffPost Solzman also mentioned attempting to interest various publications in the story the previous September and receiving several anonymous text messages on Miller's behalf allegedly threatening Solzman with blacklisting and legal action.

In response to the story, a representative for Miller said that his client was "admittedly going through some things" but denied that he was transphobic and insisted that this was "about a specific issue he has with this person".

Amtrak bomb threat incident
Miller was arrested on the night of April 9, 2018, at LaGuardia Airport in Queens, New York on federal charges related to a fake bomb threat made while aboard an Amtrak train. According to a Department of Justice press release, he placed an emergency call on March 18, 2018, and reported that a female passenger had "a bomb in her bag" while traveling on Amtrak Train 2256 from Washington, D.C., toward Penn Station in New York City. After authorities evacuated passengers and searched Amtrak Train 2256, it turned out that Miller was actually on Amtrak Train 2258, which was also evacuated of passengers and searched.

No evidence of any explosive device or materials was detected after officials stopped and inspected both trains. According to witnesses interviewed by Amtrak investigators, he appeared to be heavily intoxicated and involved "in hostile exchanges with a woman who was sitting in a different row from him in the first-class car", and that he had been removed from the train prior to his intended stop due to his intoxication. On April 10, 2018, he was released on a $100,000 bond following an appearance at a federal court hearing in New Haven, Connecticut. Ultimately, Miller's charges were dropped but if he had been convicted, he could have expected to face up to five years in prison.

In September 2018, it was reported that Miller was negotiating a plea deal to avoid a trial. As a result of this and the sexual assault allegations, DreamWorks Animation removed Miller from How to Train Your Dragon: The Hidden World, with Justin Rupple overdubbing his lines as Tuffnut. The preliminary hearing in the case, after several postponements, was scheduled for March 31, 2020.

In July 2021, charges against Miller were dismissed. Prosecutors said their decision was based on "expert medical analyses and reports regarding the defendant's prior brain surgery and its continued neurological impacts, which cast doubt upon the requisite legal element of intent to commit the charged offense." Miller agreed to "make full financial restitution for the costs of the law enforcement response to the false 911 call, and to continue a thorough and necessary program of Cognitive Remediation to render any recurrence of such conduct most highly unlikely".

Work misconduct accusations

On July 18, 2018, actress Alice Wetterlund, who played a recurring character on Silicon Valley, a show in which Miller starred, took to Twitter to accuse Miller of inappropriate, unprofessional behavior on set, writing, "I hope to not ruin it for you, but TJ Miller was a bully and petulant brat."

In response to her post, HBO, the network that produces the series, released a statement declaring that, "While this is the first time we have heard Alice Wetterlund comment on her experiences on 'Silicon Valley', we are disappointed to learn of her concerns. HBO and the producers have always taken very seriously our responsibility to create a welcoming and congenial environment for everyone who works on the show."

Filmography

Film

Television

Video games

References

External links

 
 

1981 births
21st-century American male actors
21st-century American comedians
American male comedians
American male film actors
American male television actors
American male voice actors
American Ashkenazi Jews
American people of Austrian-Jewish descent
American people of English descent
American people of German-Jewish descent
American people of Russian-Jewish descent
American people of Scottish descent
American people of Swedish descent
American expatriate actors in New Zealand
American podcasters
American stand-up comedians
Critics of religions
Jewish American male actors
Columbian College of Arts and Sciences alumni
Living people
Male actors from Denver
Alumni of the British American Drama Academy
Jewish American comedians